Ayman Rafic Hariri (born 16 May 1978) is a Lebanese billionaire businessman, the second-youngest son of tycoon Rafic Hariri. He is the CEO and co-founder of the social network Vero, and the former deputy CEO of Saudi Oger.

Early life
Ayman Hariri is the second-youngest son of Rafic Hariri. Born in Saudi Arabia, Ayman moved to Paris at age 12 to attend school.

He moved to the United States to study at Georgetown University and graduated in 1999 with a bachelor's degree in computer science.

Career 
While at Georgetown he interned at Intelsat as a programmer. After college, Hariri co-founded Epok with Scott Birnbaum in 2001. Epok was a distributed software platform designed to enable cross-network collaboration mostly designed for enterprises. The company primarily dealt with data privacy.

Following his father's assassination on 14 February 2005, Hariri returned to Saudi Arabia to support his family's business and after some years became deputy CEO and deputy chairman of Saudi Oger, one of the largest construction companies in Saudi Arabia. While at Saudi Oger, Hariri oversaw some of the biggest projects the company undertook including King Abdullah University for Science and Technology (KAUST), Princess Noura University in Riyadh and the Ritz Carlton in Riyadh and other major public projects.

In 2013, he left Saudi Oger and divested from the company in 2016. After a few years of development, Hariri launched the ad-free social network Vero in 2015.

As of February 2018, Forbes estimated his net worth at US$1.33 billion.

Controversy

Saudi Oger 
In late February 2018, Hariri's social media company, Vero, saw a marked increase in users and scrutiny. This scrutiny focused especially on Saudi Oger's inability to pay its migrant workers during 2016. According to a statement to USA Today and Gizmodo from Vero, he ceased duties as deputy CEO and deputy chairman of his family's construction company in 2013. However, Gizmodo found references to his still being in those positions as late as February 2016, after the company's founding, including in one of Vero's press releases.

Russia
In February 2018, a Twitter user criticized VERO for employing Russian developers in its team and questioned whether the app could be trusted on that basis. In a statement to Time, a Vero spokesman confirmed that the company does, "like almost every global technology company" use developers from across the world including the US, Russia, UK, Europe and Africa and dismissed the claim as baseless.

Personal life
Hariri is married and has three children He lives in Paris, France. Hariri has a collection of rare comic books, named The Impossible Collection which he exhibited in London in 2016 at the premiere of Batman v Superman: Dawn of Justice.

References

20th-century Saudi Arabian businesspeople
21st-century Saudi Arabian businesspeople
1978 births
Ayman
Lebanese billionaires
Lebanese businesspeople
Living people
Saudi Arabian people of Lebanese descent
Lebanese people of Palestinian descent